Cheraghabad-e Shokrabad (also Romanized as Cherāghābād-e Shokrābād; also known as Cherāghābād, Shokrābād, Shokr Abad Abdol Abad, and Shrākāwa) is a village in Lak Rural District, Serishabad District, Qorveh County, Kurdistan Province, Iran. At the 2006 census, its population was 169, in 37 families. The village is populated by Kurds.

References 

Towns and villages in Qorveh County
Kurdish settlements in Kurdistan Province